Nancy Sales Cash (born March 28, 1940, in North Carolina, United States) is an American novelist, journalist and television producer. A native of North Carolina, her career includes journalism (Dell Publishing Co. Inc.), advertising and public relations (Young & Rubicam Inc.), and television production (Cash Harmon Television) in North Carolina, New York, London and Sydney.

The popular Australian television show Number 96, which Cash Harmon produced, ran for five years, and is still subject of a cult following.  It was Australia's highest rated program in 1973 and 1974, and was the first English-language soap opera to be broadcast every weeknight. Nancy took over the company after the death of her husband Don Cash in 1973.

Having lived in Sydney, Australia for over twenty years, she has returned to her native western North Carolina to write novels about the magnificent Great Smoky Mountains and their history, culture and people. Her first novel was published by Pan Macmillan and optioned by an international film company. A graduate of the University of North Carolina at Chapel Hill, with a B.A. in English Literature, she lives in Asheville, North Carolina and Juno Beach, Florida with her husband Charles L. Reid and their cat "Shah."

Books
Novels:
  Murdering Oscar Wilde (2013)   - Old Mountain Press
  Ritual River (2006)  Chapel Hill Press INc.
  Patterns of the Heart (1995)

Short Stories and Anthologies:
  Christmas Presence (2002)
  Clothes Lines
  Summer of Love
  Cherokee County, N.C. (2011)

Notes

External links
Official Nancy Sales Cash website  
Number 96, Television Series 1972-1977 
The History of Australian Television - Number 96

People from North Carolina
20th-century American novelists
American expatriates in Australia
American television journalists
People from Cherokee County, North Carolina
Living people
1940 births
American women television producers
21st-century American novelists
University of North Carolina at Chapel Hill alumni
American women short story writers
American women novelists
Writers from Sydney
20th-century American women writers
21st-century American women writers
20th-century American short story writers
21st-century American short story writers
People from Juno Beach, Florida
People from Asheville, North Carolina
American women non-fiction writers
20th-century American non-fiction writers
21st-century American non-fiction writers
American women television journalists
American expatriates in England
Television producers from Florida